State Highway 304 (SH 304) is a Texas state highway that runs in a north-south direction between Bastrop and Gonzales, Texas, United States. The highway's current route was in place by 1938.

Route description
SH 304 begins at a junction with SH 97. It heads north from this junction to an intersection with I-10. The highway continues to the north to an intersection with US 90. Heading towards the north, the highway continues to an intersection FM 713. The highway continues to the northeast to an intersection with FM 535. It continues to the north to a junction with FM 2571. SH 304 reaches its northern terminus at SH 21 and SH 71 in Bastrop.

History
SH 304 was designated on December 1, 1938 along its current route. The number was not assigned until January 23, 1939. On March 29, 1957 SH 304 was proposed along new construction from its end back then to FM 1319, and FM 1319 from FM 535 to SH 71 was cancelled and combined with SH 304.

Notable landmarks
The fictional Gulf Oil gas station/barbecue joint seen in the 1974 cult classic horror movie, The Texas Chain Saw Massacre, is located on the highway south of Bastrop at 1073 SH 304, Bastrop, TX 78602. In the movie, the establishment remains nameless but is donned with a "Coca-Cola/We Slaughter Barbecue" sign.

Today, the dilapidated grocery store (and former gas station ‒ its two gas pumps as seen in the movie having since been removed) sits unused and has been closed down for several years. Before its closure, it was known as Bilbo's Texas Landmark and before that as Ryan's Hills Prairie Grocery. The location is now in the process of being restored and turned into a horror resort with a Texas chili kitchen, music venue and cabins. The ownership team is Roy Rose an Ohio entrepreneur an avid Texas chainsaw massacre fan and Ari Lehman the first Jason in the Friday the thirteenth franchise.

Junction list

References

304
Transportation in Gonzales County, Texas
Transportation in Caldwell County, Texas
Transportation in Bastrop County, Texas